Carlos Pita may refer to:
 Carlos Pita (footballer) (born 1984), Spanish footballer
 Carlos Pita (politician) (born 1951), Uruguayan politician